The Warriors is a 1979 American action thriller film directed by Walter Hill. Based on Sol Yurick's 1965 novel of the same name, it was released in the United States in February 1979. The film centers on a fictitious New York City street gang who must travel , from the north end of the Bronx to their home turf in Coney Island in southern Brooklyn, after they are framed for the murder of a respected gang leader.

After reports of vandalism and violence, Paramount temporarily halted their advertising campaign and released theater owners from their obligation to show the film. Despite its initially negative reception, The Warriors has since become a cult film and has been reappraised by film critics. The film has spawned several spinoffs, including video games and a comic book series.

In his book about the film, author Sean Egan summarized its appeal: "Whereas the milieu of The Warriors was one normally only depicted in motion pictures as an examination of a social problem, this movie portrayed life from the street gang’s point of view. It was an obvious but revolutionary approach that struck a chord with the urban working class, especially its adolescent subset."<ref>Egan, Sean. Can You Dig It: The Phenomenon of The Warriors. BearManor Media, 2021, p. 2.</ref>

Plot
Cyrus, leader of the Gramercy Riffs, the most powerful gang in New York City, requests that each of the city’s gangs send nine unarmed delegates to Van Cortlandt Park for a midnight summit. The Warriors, a gang from Coney Island, attend the summit with nine delegates: leader Cleon, second-in-command Swan, the scout Fox, the graffiti tagger Rembrandt, and soldiers Snow, Cowboy, Cochise, Vermin, and Ajax.  Cyrus proposes to the assembled crowd a citywide truce and alliance that would allow the gangs to control the city together, since they collectively outnumber the police by three to one.

Most of the gang members applaud this idea, but Luther, the unbalanced and sadistic leader of the Rogues, shoots Cyrus dead as police officers arrive to raid the summit. In the ensuing chaos, Luther realizes that one of the Warriors, Fox, appears to suspect him, and makes a false accusation which leads the vengeful Riffs to attack the "Warlord", Cleon. Meanwhile, the other Warriors escape, unaware that they have been implicated in Cyrus's killing. The Riffs put out a hit on the Warriors through a radio DJ. Swan, the "War Chief," takes charge of the group as they try to get home.

The Turnbull ACs spot the Warriors and try to run them down with a modified school bus, but the Warriors escape and board an elevated train. On the ride to Coney Island, the train is stopped by a building fire alongside the tracks, stranding the Warriors in Tremont. Setting out on foot, they encounter the Orphans, who are insecure about their low status in the gang hierarchy as they were excluded from Cyrus's meeting. After Mercy, the girlfriend of the Orphans' leader, instigates a confrontation, Swan throws a Molotov cocktail and the Warriors run to the nearest subway station. Impressed, and desperate to escape her depressed neighborhood, Mercy follows the Warriors.

When the group arrives at the 96th Street and Broadway station in Manhattan, they are pursued by police and separated. Three of them, Vermin, Cochise and Rembrandt, escape by boarding a subway car. Fox, struggling with a police officer, is thrown onto the tracks and is fatally hit by a passing train as Mercy flees the scene. Swan, Ajax, Snow and Cowboy are chased by the Baseball Furies into Riverside Park but defeat them in a brawl. After the fight, Ajax sees a lone woman sitting on a park bench and leaves the group despite Swan's objections. When Ajax becomes sexually aggressive, the woman, revealed to be an undercover police officer, handcuffs him to the bench and arrests him.

Upon arriving at Union Square, Vermin, Cochise and Rembrandt are seduced by an all-female gang called the Lizzies and invited into their hideout. They narrowly escape the Lizzies' subsequent attack, learning in the process that the gangland community believes the Warriors murdered Cyrus. Acting as a lone scout, Swan decides to return to the 96th Street station, where Mercy joins him (although he spurns her promiscuity). After reaching the Union Square station, they reunite with the remaining Warriors and engage in a fight with a roller-skating gang, the Punks, which allows Mercy to prove herself in combat. Meanwhile, an unidentified gang member visits the Riffs and tells them that he saw Luther shoot Cyrus.

At dawn, the Warriors finally reach Coney Island, only to find Luther and the Rogues waiting for them. Swan challenges Luther to single combat, but Luther pulls a gun instead. Swan dodges his shot and throws a switchblade (taken from one of the Punks) into Luther's wrist, disarming him. The Riffs arrive, acknowledging the Warriors' courage and skill before apprehending the Rogues. As the Riffs descend upon him, Luther screams. The radio DJ announces that "the big alert has been called off" and salutes the Warriors with a song, "In the City." The film ends with Swan, Mercy and the rest of the gang walking down a Coney Island beach, illuminated by the rising sun.

Cast

Featured as gang leaders in the film are Paul Greco as the leader of the Orphans, Jery Hewitt as the leader of the Baseball Furies, Kate Klugman as the leader of the Lizzies, and Konrad Sheehan as the leader of the Punks. Stunt coordinator and future director Craig R. Baxley appears as a member of the Punks, as does stuntman A.J. Bakunas, who was killed on the set of another movie before the film's release. Steve James and Bill Anagnos portray Baseball Furies, while Dennis Gregory portrays a Gramercy Riff. Bronx guitarist Ace Frehley, best known for his work with the hard rock band Kiss, has stated that he had been a member of The Duckies in his youth, one of the real New York City gangs featured in the film. Mercedes Ruehl plays the policewoman who arrests Ajax, with Irwin Keyes and Sonny Landham also appearing as police officers. Ginny Ortiz portrays the candy store employee whom the Rogues steal from and John Snyder portrays a gas station worker. In a pre-credits scene deleted from the theatrical version but reinstated in television broadcasts, Pamela Poitier (a daughter of Sidney Poitier) portrays Lincoln, Cleon's girlfriend.

Production
Development
The film is based on Sol Yurick's 1965 novel The Warriors, which was, in turn, based on Xenophon's Anabasis. Film rights were bought in 1969 by American International Pictures but no film resulted.

Rights were then obtained by producer Lawrence Gordon who commissioned David Shaber to write a script. Gordon had made Hard Times (1975) and The Driver (1978) with Walter Hill; he sent the script to Hill with a copy of Sol Yurick's novel. Hill recalls, "I said 'Larry, I would love to do this, but nobody will let us do it.' It was going to be too extreme and too weird."

Gordon and Hill were originally going to make a western but when the financing on the project failed to materialize, they took The Warriors to Paramount Pictures because they were interested in youth films at the time and succeeded in getting the project financed. Hill remembers "it came together very quickly. Larry had a special relationship with Paramount and we promised to make the movie very cheaply, which we did. So it came together within a matter of weeks. I think we got the green light in April or May 1978 and we were in theaters in February 1979. So it was a very accelerated process."

Hill was drawn to the "extreme narrative simplicity and stripped down quality of the script". The script, as written, was a realistic take on street gangs but Hill was a huge fan of comic books and wanted to divide the film into chapters and then have each chapter "come to life starting with a splash panel". However, Hill was working on a low budget and a tight post-production schedule because of a fixed release date as the studio wanted to release The Warriors before a rival gang picture called The Wanderers. Hill was finally able to include this type of scene transition in the Ultimate Director's Cut released for home video in 2005.

Casting
The filmmakers did extensive casting in New York City. Hill was considering hiring Sigourney Weaver from Alien and watched a movie she'd filmed in Israel called Madman where the male lead opposite Weaver was played by Michael Beck. The director was impressed with Beck's performance and cast him in The Warriors. Hill initially wanted a Puerto Rican actress for the role of Mercy, but Deborah Van Valkenburgh's agent convinced the film's casting directors to see her and she was eventually cast. The filmmakers wanted to cast Tony Danza in the role of Vermin but he was cast in the sitcom Taxi and Terry Michos was cast instead. While there were white characters in Yurick's book, none of the central characters or protagonists were white: according to Hill, Paramount did not want an all-black cast for "commercial reasons".

Walter Hill saw Thomas G. Waites as the next James Dean and the director "invited the young actor to the Gulf and Western to watch movies like Rebel Without a Cause and East of Eden for inspiration." During the screening, Hill offered Waites a drink, which Waites refused, resulting in a rift between the two that grew worse during the grueling summer shoot. At one point, Waites threatened to report the working conditions to the Screen Actors Guild, forcing Paramount to provide a second trailer for the eight Warriors to share.

Finally eight weeks into principal photography, when the tension on set between Waites and Hill reached the breaking point, Hill demanded that stunt coordinator Craig Baxley improvise a stunt scene in which Waites' character would be killed. "Stunned, Baxley demurred. Such a critical scene would take careful planning. But Hill was insistent. 'I don't give a shit how you kill him,' Baxley recalls the director saying. 'Kill him.'" Baxley found a crew member who resembled Waites and staged a scene in which the character is thrown off a subway platform in front of an approaching train. "It was like someone cut my soul out and left a shell", Waites remembers. He would later demand that his name be removed from the cast altogether; he remains uncredited to this day.

Filming

Stunt coordinator Craig R. Baxley put the cast through stunt school because Hill wanted realistic fights depicted in the film. In preparation for his role, James Remar hung out at Coney Island to find a model for his character. The entire film was shot on the streets in New York City with some interior scenes done at Astoria Studios. They would shoot from sundown to sunrise. The film quickly fell behind schedule and went over budget. Although the Conclave scene at the beginning was supposed to be in The Bronx, it was actually filmed in Riverside Park in Manhattan. The bathroom fight scene against The Punks was shot in a studio. The entire movie was only filmed in Manhattan, Brooklyn & Queens. Actor Joel Weiss remembers that filming of his scene on Avenue A, in Manhattan's notorious Alphabet City, was canceled because there was a double homicide nearby. For the big meeting at the beginning of the film, Hill wanted real gang members in the scene with off duty police officers also in the crowd so that there would be no trouble.

The studio would not allow Baxley to bring any stunt men from Hollywood and he needed someone to double for the character of Cyrus so he did the stunt himself dressed as the character. Actual gang members wanted to challenge some of the cast members but were dealt with by production security. The actors playing the Warriors bonded early in the shoot, on and off the set. Originally, the character of Fox was supposed to end up with Mercy, while Swan was captured by a rival, homosexual gang known as the Dingos, only to escape later. However, Hill watched the dailies and realized that Beck and Van Valkenburgh had great chemistry; the script was rewritten so that their characters ended up together.

The Rogues' car in the Coney Island confrontation was a 1955 Cadillac hearse. Originally, at the Coney Island confrontation at the end of the film, actor David Patrick Kelly wanted to use two dead pigeons but Hill did not think that would work. Instead, Kelly improvised by clinking three bottles in his right hand and ad-libbing his famous line, "Waaaaarriors, come out to plaaaay". Kelly based the line on a taunt that a neighbor used to chant to him when he was a child.

Hill wanted Orson Welles to do a narrated introduction about Greek themes but the studio did not like this idea and refused to pay for it. However this sequence was finally included in the 2005 Ultimate Director's Cut, with Hill providing the narration himself. "I wanted to take it into a fantasy element, but at the same time add some contemporary flash", said Hill. "Those were some of the hard ideas we had to get the studio to understand. But we did not get along very well with our parent company. After the movie came out and it did well, everybody was sort of friends. But up until then there was a lot of misunderstanding. They thought it was going to be Saturday Night Fever or something."

Release
Theatrical runThe Warriors opened on February 9, 1979, in 670 theaters without advance screenings or a decent promotional campaign and grossed USD $3.5 million on its opening weekend.

Violence at screenings
The following weekend the film was linked to sporadic outbreaks of vandalism and three killings—two in Southern California and one in Boston—involving moviegoers on their way to or from showings.

Paramount was prompted to remove advertisements from radio and television completely and display ads in the press were reduced to the film's title, rating and participating theaters. As a reaction 200 theaters across the country added security personnel. Due to safety concerns, theater owners were relieved of their contractual obligations if they did not want to show the film, and Paramount offered to pay costs for additional security and damages due to vandalism.

Hill later remembered, "I think the reason why there were some violent incidents is really very simple: The movie was very popular with the street gangs, especially young men, a lot of whom had very strong feelings about each other. And suddenly they all went to the movies together! They looked across the aisle and there were the guys they didn't like, so there were a lot of incidents. And also, the movie itself is rambunctious—I would certainly say that."

Reception
Box office
After two weeks free of incidents, the studio expanded the display ads to take advantage of reviews from reputable critics including Pauline Kael of The New Yorker. She wrote, "The Warriors is a real moviemaker's movie: it has in visual terms the kind of impact that 'Rock Around the Clock' did behind the titles of Blackboard Jungle. The Warriors is like visual rock." At Seattle's Grand Illusion Cinema, programmer Zack Carlson remembers, "people were squeezed in, lying on the floor, cheering." By its sixth week, The Warriors had grossed $16.4 million, well above its estimated $4 million to $7 million budget.

Walter Hill reflected:

What made it a success with young people... is that for the first time somebody made a film within Hollywood, big distribution, that took the gang situation and did not present it as a social problem. Presented them as a neutral or positive aspect of their lives. As soon as you said in the old days gang movies it was how do we cure the pestilence and how do we fix the social waste. We want to take these kids, make sure they go to college... This was just a movie that conceptually was different. Accepted the idea of the gang, didn't question it, that was their lives, they functioned within that context. And the social problem wasn't were they going to college, but were they going to survive. It's the great Hawksian dictum, where is the drama? Will he live or die? That's the drama.

"Hollywood forgives a lot when you have a hit," he added. "I don't know what to say about it, other than the fact that it was just a gift in terms of getting it. The studio hated it, and didn't even want to release it. There was a lot of friction with management at the time. Some of it might have been my fault."

Critical receptionThe Warriors received negative reviews from contemporary critics, who derided its lack of realism and found its dialogue stilted. In his review for the Chicago Sun-Times, Roger Ebert gave it two out of four stars and wrote that, despite Hill's cinematic skill, the film is implausible in a mannerist style that deprives the characters of depth and spontaneity: "No matter what impression the ads give, this isn't even remotely intended as an action film. It's a set piece. It's a ballet of stylized male violence."

However, Ebert later wrote during a review of Hill's film Southern Comfort that he felt he overlooked some positive qualities in The Warriors out of his dislike for Hill's general approach to broad characterizations. Gene Siskel gave the film one star out of four, likening the dialogue to that of "Harvey Lembeck in those silly '60s motorcycle pictures" and concluding, "You would think after watching 'The Warriors' that gang membership was a victimless crime, save for the occasional sadist who pops up as comic relief. This entire film is a romantic lie."

Linda Gross of the Los Angeles Times called the film "an insightful, stylized and shallow portrayal of gang warfare that panders to angry youthful audiences." Gary Arnold of The Washington Post wrote, "None of Hill's dynamism will save The Warriors from impressing most neutral observers as a ghastly folly." In his review for Newsweek, David Ansen wrote, "Another problem arises when the gang members open their mouths: their banal dialogue is jarringly at odds with Hill's hyperbolic visual scheme."

Frank Rich of Time wrote, "unfortunately, sheer visual zip is not enough to carry the film; it drags from one scuffle to the next ... The Warriors is not lively enough to be cheap fun or thoughtful enough to be serious." Yurick expressed his disappointment and speculated that it scared some people because "it appeals to the fear of a demonic uprising by lumpen youth", appealing to many teenagers because it "hits a series of collective fantasies." President Ronald Reagan was a fan of the film, even calling lead actor Michael Beck to tell him he had screened it at Camp David and enjoyed it.

Cult statusThe Warriors has become a cult film, and some film critics have since re-examined it. As of August 2022, the film garnered an 88% approval rating at Rotten Tomatoes, based on 48 reviews. The critical consensus reads: "As violent as it is stylish, The Warriors is a thrilling piece of pulp filmmaking."

In 2003, The New York Times placed the film on its "Best 1,000 Movies Ever Made". Entertainment Weekly named it the 16th-greatest cult film on its 2003 "Top 50 Greatest Cult Films" list, and ranked it 14th in its 2008 list of the "25 Most Controversial Movies Ever".

Hill reflected in 2016:

I love the fact that people still enjoy something I did what, 37 years ago? It makes an old man happy. I'm surprised by it. But I loved working with my cameraman Andy Laszlo in shooting it, and I loved working with my cast, who were incredibly trusting of this crazy old fucker that was making the movie. They didn't get it, I don't think—costumed gangs running around New York?—but they just went with it.

Home video
The film was first released on VHS in the 1980s and 1990s and DVD in 2000. The DVD contained the theatrical cut unrestored; this release has since fallen out of print. Then, in 2005, Paramount Home Entertainment released the "Ultimate Director's Cut" DVD of The Warriors. In addition to remastered picture quality and a new 5.1 surround remixed soundtrack, the film was re-edited with a new introduction and comic book-style sequences between scenes. In July 2007, the "Ultimate Director's Cut" was released on Blu-ray and has since been available for online streaming rentals and purchases through Amazon, iTunes, Google Play, Vudu and YouTube. The original theatrical cut is available to stream in HD on those same services and was released as a Manufactured On Demand DVD in the U.S. in March 2020 by Paramount. In May 2022, The Warriors received another release through [imprint] on Blu-ray in Australia, which included not only the "Ultimate Director's Cut", but also the theatrical version, which hadn't had a Blu-ray release before.

Soundtrack
The film's soundtrack, featuring music by Barry De Vorzon, Joe Walsh, and others, was released on the A&M label in March 1979.

In other media
Merchandise
In 2005, Mezco Toyz released several action figures based on characters from the film, including Swan, Cleon, Cochise, Ajax, Luther, and a Baseball Fury.

 Video games 
A fighting video game based on the film was released by Rockstar Games in October 2005. The game expands upon the story of the film, featuring 13 levels that take place before the film's events and depict the Warriors' rise to power. The final five levels directly adapt the events of the film, with only a few changes. Several of the actors from the film returned to reprise their roles. In 2005, Roger Hill (who portrayed Cyrus in the film) sued Rockstar Games and Take-Two Interactive for royalty fees, claiming the video game used his voice and depiction of his likeness without his consent or paying him royalties. Take-Two asserted its claims that the voice and likeness of Cyrus were a component of its licensing agreement for the film. Roger Hill died in 2014 with the case unresolved.

In 2009, Warner Bros. Entertainment released a beat 'em up scroller game based on the film, titled The Warriors: Street Brawl.

 Board game 
The Warriors: Come Out to Play board game was published by Funko Games in 2022.

Television series
In July 2016, Joe and Anthony Russo announced they were working with Paramount Television and Hulu for a re-imagined Warriors TV series; Frank Baldwin was signed on to write the series. In June 2018, development of the series was moved to Netflix.

Possible remake
Tony Scott had planned a remake of the film. In an interview in 2005, Scott said that the remake would be set in modern-day New York City; gangs such as the Baseball Furies and Hi-Hats would not be included in the remake. After the death of Scott, Mark Neveldine showed interest in directing a remake.

In popular culture

 The first "Warriors UltraRun" was held in 2019. Long distance runners dressed as gang members from the film ran from the Bronx to Coney Island, a distance of about 28 miles. 
 The band The Outfield took inspiration for their name from the Baseball Furies gang in the film. After seeing the film, guitarist John Spinks had dubbed the band "The Baseball Boys", but this was later changed to The Outfield based on the advice of their American manager.
 The film is referenced in the third-season Bob's Burgers episode "Full Bars".
 The film is referenced in the 25th-season The Simpsons episode "The Winter of His Content", where Bart and his bullies escape other bullies when they are framed for attacking the bully that organized the meeting.
 On September 13, 2015, there was a "Last Subway Ride Reunion" festival in Coney Island celebrating the film, organized by Eric Nyenhuis. Several actors from the film also recreated the subway ride home, filmed by Rolling Stone magazine, including Michael Beck (Swan), David Harris (Cochise), Dorsey Wright (Cleon), Thomas G. Waites (Fox), Bryan Tyler (Snow) and Terry Michos (Vermin). Other cast members that attended the event included: David Kopland, Furies gang actors Jery Hewitt, Eddie Hatch, Bill Anagnos, Harry Madsen, Leon Delaney and Rob Ryder, as well as Apache Ramos, Konrad Sheehan and Ginny Ortiz. The promotional website indicated that Deborah Van Valkenburgh and David Patrick Kelly could not attend due to scheduling conflicts. Scheduled events included a cosplay contest, an autograph session and photo opportunities, panel discussion, a screening of the film, and musical performances by Gotham City Mashers and Sick of It All. A premium "Warchief" pass included a replica of the vests worn by the Warriors in the film as well as VIP seating and express lines for autographs.
 The film is referenced in the 2017 DuckTales episode "The Beagle Birthday Massacre!", where Webby and Lena escape several groups of Beagle Boys after infiltrating their territory.

See also

 Explanatory notes 

References

Further reading
Egan, Sean. 2021. Can You Dig It: The Phenomenon of The Warriors''. Georgia: BearManor Media. ISBN 978-1-6293380-5-7.

External links

 
 
 
 
 
 2006 Warriors Cast Reunion 
 

Film
1970s action drama films
American action drama films
American chase films
American gang films
Urban survival films
Anabasis (Xenophon)
Hood films
1970s English-language films
Films adapted into comics
Films based on American novels
Films directed by Walter Hill
Films scored by Barry De Vorzon
Films set in amusement parks
Films set in Coney Island
Films set in Brooklyn
Films set in the Bronx
Films set on the New York City Subway
Films shot in New York City
Films with screenplays by Walter Hill
Paramount Pictures films
1979 drama films
1970s American films